Ragnar Halvorsen (7 January 1893 – 11 June 1933) was a Norwegian footballer. He played in two matches for the Norway national football team in 1912 to 1913.

References

External links
 

1893 births
1933 deaths
Norwegian footballers
Norway international footballers
Place of birth missing
Association footballers not categorized by position